Budiu may refer to one of two places in Mureș County, Romania:

 Budiu Mic, a village in Crăciunești Commune
 Budiu de Câmpie, the former name of Papiu Ilarian Commune